Hugh Gibbons (6 July 1916 – 14 November 2007) was an Irish Fianna Fáil politician who sat in Dáil Éireann as a Teachta Dála (TD) for twelve years, from 1965 to 1977.

Early life
He was born 6 July 1916 in Ballybeg, Strokestown, County Roscommon, the fourth child of Luke Gibbons and his wife Ellen (née Egan). His parents married in 1910 and his father was a publican and merchant. Hugh Gibbons was educated in Camaska national school, Strokestown, and in 1929 won a scholarship to attend secondary school at Summerhill College, Sligo. In 1934 he won a scholarship to University College Galway and passed his final medical exams in December 1940.

Politics
A medical doctor before entering politics, Gibbons was elected on his first attempt, when he stood as a Fianna Fáil candidate in the Roscommon constituency at the 1965 general election. After constituency changes, he was re-elected at the 1969 general election in the new Roscommon–Leitrim constituency. He was returned to the Dáil again at the 1973 general election, but did not contest the 1977 general election and retired from politics.

Sports
Gibbons was also holder of three All-Ireland Medals while playing for Roscommon in the All-Ireland Senior Club Football and Junior Club Football Championships. In 1940 he played with the county junior team, which won the All-Ireland junior title that year. He then played for the county team which won the All-Ireland senior titles in 1943 and 1944. He also played for and co founded St Ronan's GAA club in North Roscommon.

Death and personal life
He married Josephine Lee in 1949, and they had four sons and two dughters. His son, Brian Gibbons was the Labour Party Welsh Assembly Member for Aberavon from 1999 to 2010. 

He died on 14 November 2007 at his home in Keadue, aged 91. On his death, he was described by then Taoiseach Bertie Ahern as a "sportsman and a scholar".

References

1916 births
2007 deaths
Fianna Fáil TDs
Irish sportsperson-politicians
Members of the 18th Dáil
Members of the 19th Dáil
Members of the 20th Dáil
Politicians from County Roscommon
Roscommon inter-county Gaelic footballers
St Ronan's Gaelic footballers
Alumni of the University of Galway
People educated at Summerhill College